Newbury was a 52-gun third rate  frigate built for the navy of the Commonwealth of England at Limehouse, and launched in 1654. She was named for the Parliamentarian victories at the two battles of Newbury.

After the Restoration in 1660, she was renamed HMS Revenge. She spent some time carrying the flag of the senior captain of Prince Rupert's white (van) squadron, commanded by Robert Holmes.  By 1677 her armament had been increased to 62 guns, though she was condemned in 1678, and presumably broken up.

Notes

References

Lavery, Brian (2003) The Ship of the Line - Volume 1: The development of the battlefleet 1650-1850. Conway Maritime Press. .

External links 
 The history of HMS Newbury

Ships of the line of the Royal Navy
1650s ships
Speaker-class ships of the line